Opsiplanon is a genus of achilid planthoppers in the family Achilidae. There are at least three described species in Opsiplanon.

Species
These three species belong to the genus Opsiplanon:
 Opsiplanon luellus (Metcalf, 1923) c g b
 Opsiplanon nemorosus Fennah, 1945 c g
 Opsiplanon ornatifrons Fennah, 1945 c g
Data sources: i = ITIS, c = Catalogue of Life, g = GBIF, b = Bugguide.net

References

Further reading

External links

 

Achilidae
Auchenorrhyncha genera